Loompanics Unlimited was an American book seller and publisher specializing in nonfiction on generally unconventional or controversial topics. The topics in their title list included drugs, weapons, survivalism, anarchism, sex, conspiracy theories, and so on. Many of their titles describe some kind of illicit or extralegal actions, such as Counterfeit I.D. Made Easy and Opium for the Masses, while others are purely informative, such as Uninhabited Ocean Islands, How to Buy Land Cheap and The Muckraker's Manual (recommended by Stewart Brand).

Company history
Loompanics was in business for nearly 30 years. Its publisher and editor was Michael "Mike" Hoy who started Loompanics Unlimited in East Lansing, Michigan, in 1975. In 1982 he moved the business to Port Townsend, Washington, where his friend and fellow publisher R. W. Bradford had earlier relocated.

In January 2006, Loompanics announced that it was going out of business, and that it was selling off its inventory. In the spring of 2006, Paladin Press announced that it acquired the rights to 40 titles previously published or sold by Loompanics, including the works of Claire Wolfe, Eddie the Wire, and other popular Loompanics authors.

Market position 

In addition to Loompanics' large annual catalog of all its stock, Loompanics regularly mailed its customers a thinner quarterly supplement featuring a selection of books interspersed with articles about government propaganda and conspiracies, and/or underground resistance. The addressing side of the cover included a World War II American graphic of an eagle carrying a stack of volumes and the slogan, "Our men want books!"

Loompanics did not fall into the categories of mainstream liberal, conservative, or libertarian politics. While Michael Hoy expresses a preference for free markets, he also criticizes libertarians for championing multinational corporations, which he describes in a 2005 article as being entirely different entities from individuals. Hoy characterizes them as governmental entities, since their limited liability is the result of government fiat, rather than contractual dealings among individuals. Thus, in some ways, Hoy argues,  corporations have more rights than individuals. He also criticized libertarians for brainwashing themselves, stating:

Hoy's articles, which systemically lambasted the policies of all major political groups, earned him the wrath of organizations across the political spectrum.

Loompanics' FAQ stated that the company's name is a play on words inspired by Hoy's fondness for National Lampoon.

Advertising rejections 

According to Gia Cosindas, Amazon.com, eBay, and Google refused to allow Loompanics to advertise on their sites, since some of the books' content violates their editorial guidelines. Specifically, Google wrote, "At this time, Google policy does not permit the advertisement of websites that contain 'the promotion of violence [and] drugs or drug paraphernalia.'"

Legacy and aftermath 
On May 8, 2006, Loompanics stopped accepting retail orders. Their website encouraged potential customers to contact other publishers, who have had several Loompanics titles transferred to them, or became the new publishers of established Loompanics authors.

Last Earth Distro, Last Word Books & Press, AK Press, Earthlight Books, Eden Press, FS Books, Laissez Faire Books, Lehman's, New Falcon Publications, Privacy Alert Online, Ronin Press, Steve Arnold's Gun Room and Uncle Fester's Books acquired most of Loompanics' back stock. Some titles have been reprinted by Paladin Press and Delta Press.

Publications
 Loompanics' Golden Records: Articles & Features from the Best Book Catalog in the World! (1993). 
Republished by Microcosm Publishing.
 Loompanics Unlimited Catalog (2003).

References

Further reading
 "Ace Backwards Interviews Michael Hoy of Loompanics Unlimited." Flipside (fanzine), no. 71, March/April 1991.
 "FBI releases files on controversial booksellers Paladin and Loompanics." Boing Boing, 20 July 2011.
 Mizokami, Kyle. "Poisons, gasses, missiles, booby traps and bombs—'The Poor Man's James Bond' was a guide to homemade weapons." medium.com, 17 January 2014.
 Triplett, William. "Self-Help Books for the Anarchist Survivalist Iconoclast Mercenary in You." Sun-Sentinel [Florida], 23 November 1985.

External links 
 Loompanics Unlimited at Museum of the Vistula
 An incomplete list of books published by Loompanics Unlimited at Goodreads
 AuthorViews video interview with founder Michael Hoy at Staunton Media Lab
 

Publishing companies established in 1975
Defunct book publishing companies of the United States
Defunct companies based in Washington (state)
Anarchist publishing companies
Companies disestablished in 2006
Companies based in Port Townsend, Washington